Dinar Sara (also Romanized as Dīnār Sarā) is a village in Tameshkol Rural District, Nashta District, Tonekabon County, Mazandaran Province, Iran. At the 2006 census, its population was 718, in 180 families.

References 

Populated places in Tonekabon County